Denys Gaith, BC (19 March 1910 in Yabroud, Syria – 22 March 1986) was Archbishop of the Melkite Greek Catholic Archeparchy of Homs in Syria.

Life

Denys Gaith was ordained on 8 September 1937 and became the Chaplain of the Saint John the Baptist Basilians. The Assembly of Bishops of the Melkite Greek Catholic Church elected him on 19 August 1971 as successor of Jean Bassoul as Archbishop of Homs. Melkite Patriarch Maximos V Hakim was his consecrator and his co-consecrators were Archbishop Athanase Oh-Chaer, BC and Archbishop Nicolas Hajj, SDS on 12 September 1971. Gaith held office until his death, when he was succeeded by Abraham Nehmé.

References

External links
 http://www.catholic-hierarchy.org/bishop/bgaith.html
 https://web.archive.org/web/20120419194326/http://www.pgc-lb.org/english/Church3.shtml#Homs

1910 births
1986 deaths
Melkite Greek Catholic bishops
Syrian Melkite Greek Catholics
People from Rif Dimashq Governorate
20th-century Syrian people
20th-century Eastern Catholic archbishops
20th-century people from the Ottoman Empire